Julia Louise Bienias is an American biostatistician known for her highly-cited publications on Alzheimer's disease.

Education and career
Bienias completed her Ph.D. in 1993 at the Harvard School of Public Health. Her dissertation was Design and Analysis of Time-to-Pregnancy Studies, and was supervised by Louise M. Ryan.
She has worked for the United States Census Bureau, for the Rush University Medical Center, and for the Nielsen Corporation.

Recognition
Bienias was president of the Caucus for Women in Statistics for the 2005 term.
She is an Elected Member of the International Statistical Institute, and was named a Fellow of the American Statistical Association in 2021.

Selected publications

References

Year of birth missing (living people)
Living people
American statisticians
Women statisticians
Harvard School of Public Health alumni
Elected Members of the International Statistical Institute
Fellows of the American Statistical Association